Viva Kerala Football Club (also known as Chirag United Club Kerala) was an Indian professional association football club based in the city of Kochi, Kerala, India. The club was originally formed in 2004, as Viva Kerala. They participated in the National Football League, and I-League, then top tiers of Indian football league system, alongside Kerala Premier League. The club was dissolved in 2012.

Chirag United Kerala was one of the most talented and the youngest sides in the I-League, but were referred as one of the unluckiest sides in the league.

History

Formation and journey
Chirag United Club Kerala was formed on 8 August 2004 in Kochi. The club officially took off on 19 August in a ceremony at the FACT grounds. The club was formed by a group of businessmen who felt the need for the state's representation in country's top football league, the National Football League (NFL). Viva Kerala's name is the result of a contest, won by Dr. P Ramakrishnan of Ernakulam.

Chirag Kerala won the 2005–06 season of Kerala State Football League, their only regional title. In September 2006, they emerged victorious in Tirur All-India Football Tournament in Tirur, beating Travancore Titanium XI 1–0. They also reached the final of E. K. Nayanar Memorial Football Gold Cup in 2007 but lost at the end to Ghanaian side Nania Accra FC, by 3–0 margin.

In 2007, the opportunity for an NFL spot came in the way of Second Division NFL. Viva surprised everyone by finishing second in its group and qualified for the final phase. In the final phase, Viva Kerala finished as runners-up of the Second Division NFL to book their place in the I-League 2007–08 on 6 April 2007. The club along with Salgaocar, were relegated to 2nd division at the end of I-league 2007–08, for the first time in the league history. In the next season Viva Kerala were promoted for the 2009–10 season, after finishing as runners-up of the
2009 I-League 2nd Division.

In 2010, it was announced that I-League clubs needed to complete the AFC club licensing criteria; Viva signed P. K. Kunhikrishnan (A-licensed coach) as the new head coach. In August 2011, Chirag Computers was announced as the to be new majority owners and the club name would change to Chirag United Club Kerala.

In June 2011, Chirag Computers bought the financially troubled Viva Kerala FC. They took over a 60% stake in the club while original owners retained a 40% stake. They also changed the name of the club to Chirag United Club Kerala. Chirag Computers have also said that they might move the team to Kolkata if they do not find a suitable stadium in Kerala. The name of the team was officially changed to Chirag United Club Kerala on 6 August 2011. While the new owners announced that team will be based in Kerala for the 2011–12 I-League, there were talks of shifting the team to Kolkata after the season. This would leave the state of Kerala without representation in the I-League. Many supporters of the club had come out strongly against this idea. Finally the club got dissolved in 2012.

Last season (2011–12)

Chirag were eliminated from the Federation Cup in the group stages when they lost all three group D matches; Coach K.P. Kunhikrishan was replaced by Sri Lankan Pakir Ali. Pakir was sacked in February after a poor run; Biswajit Bhattacharya was appointed as the technical director and was put in charge of the team. Chirag finished second to last at 12th in the 2011–12 I-League season, Pailan Arrows had finished 13th were exempted from relegation as a "developmental team", and so Chirag relegated. Players may have had difficulty being paid when Chirag Computers may not have released sponsorship money to the club, and the club got dissolved.

Crest

The Chirag Crest was very colourful. It shows a yellow shield with the words "Chirag United Kerala", which is imposed over a Coconut tree and a Soccer ball.

Stadiums

Ever since their creation Chirag United Kerala have played in multiple stadiums. For their first three I-League seasons Chirag used the Municipal Corporation Stadium which holds a capacity of 80,000 in Kozhikode, and Jawahar Municipal Stadium which holds a capacity of 30,000 in Kannur.

They then after getting bought by Chirag Computers decided to move to the Jawarharlal Nehru International Stadium in Kochi which boasts a capacity of 70,000 and has working floodlights. They played all their home games of 2011–12 I-League at the Jawarharlal Nehru International Stadium.

Rivalries
Chiang United Kerala shared rivalries with other Kerala-based clubs including Kerala Police FC, SBI Kerala, FC Kochin, Travancore Titanium XI and Quartz Calicut, whom they faced in both the domestic and regional leagues.

Ownership
The club was established in 2004 by a group of businessmen with an objective to represent Kerala in higher circles of domestic football in India. Interestingly, the name of the club was arrived upon through a public contest organised by the promoters of the club.

The club was ran by Musli Power X-tra Kunnath Pharmaceuticals. In July 2011, Chirag Computers came in and brought full stake in the club, changing the name to Chirag United Club Kerala.

Kit manufacturers and shirt sponsors

Notable former players
For all former notable Chirag United Kerala players with a Wikipedia article, see: Chirag United Club Kerala players.

Honours

League
National Football League II
Runners-up (1): 2006–07
 I-League 2nd Division
Runners-up (1): 2009
 Kerala Football League
Champions (1): 2005–06
Runners-up (1): 2004–05
 Kerala State Club Football Championship
Runners-up (1): 2005
 National Football League III 
Champions (1): 2006–07

Cup
 Tirur All-India Football Tournament
Champions (1): 2006
 EK Nayanar Memorial Gold Cup
Runners-up (1): 2007

See also
 History of Chirag United Club Kerala
 List of football clubs in Kerala
 Sports in Kerala

References

Further reading

External links

 Chirag United Kerala at Soccerway
Chirag United Kerala at WorldFootball.net
Chirag United Kerala at Everything For Football (archived)

Chirag United Kerala at Global Sports Archive

 
Football clubs in Kerala
Association football clubs established in 2004
I-League clubs
I-League 2nd Division clubs
2004 establishments in Kerala
Association football clubs disestablished in 2012
2012 disestablishments in India